Sundari Devi Saraswati Vidya Mandir (commonly known as SDSVM, Bataha) is a residential school in the Bataha village, Samastipur, Bihar, India.

History
SDSVM was founded in 1998 with around 200 students by Dr Ram Swaroop Mahto, who also originally came from the village. After leaving India and becoming an ophthalmologist in England, he decided to build a school to educate the people of his village. He also decide to build a medical college, but this dream would not be successful.

Financial aid
Some of the children receive financial support from the Friends of Sundridevi, a British charitable organisation.

External links
Official website
Sundri Devi High School Bataha at the wikispaces.com (Wikispaces)

Schools in Bihar
Samastipur district
Boarding schools in Bihar
Samastipur
1998 establishments in Bihar
Educational institutions established in 1998